Tesamorelin (INN) (trade name Egrifta SV) is a synthetic form of growth-hormone-releasing hormone (GHRH) which is used in the treatment of HIV-associated lipodystrophy, approved initially in 2010. It is produced and developed by Theratechnologies, Inc. of Canada. The drug is a synthetic peptide consisting of all 44 amino acids of human GHRH with the addition of a trans-3-hexenoic acid group.

Mechanism of action 
Tesamorelin is the N-terminally modified compound based on 44 amino acids sequence of human GHRH. This modified synthetic form is more potent and stable than the natural peptide. It is also more resistant to cleavage by the dipeptidyl aminopeptidase than human GHRH. It stimulates the synthesis and release of endogenous GH, with an increase in level of insulin-like growth factor (IGF-1). The released GH then binds with the receptors present on various body organs and regulates the body composition. This regulation is mainly because of the combination of anabolic and lipolytic mechanisms. However, it has been found that the main mechanisms by which Tesamorelin reduces body fat mass are lipolysis followed by reduction in triglycerides level.

Contraindication 
Tesamorelin therapy may cause glucose intolerance and increase the risk of type 2-diabetes, so it is contraindicated in pregnancy. It is also contraindicated in pregnancy (category X) because it may cause harm to fetus. It is also contraindicated in patients affected by hypothalamic-pituitary axis disruption due to pituitary gland tumor, head irradiation and hypopituitarism.

Adverse effects 
Injection site erythema, peripheral edema, injection site pruritus and diarrhea.

See also 
 List of growth hormone secretagogues

References 

Growth hormone secretagogues
Growth hormone-releasing hormone receptor agonists
HIV/AIDS
Merck brands
Peptides
Recombinant proteins
World Anti-Doping Agency prohibited substances